Fünf letzte Tage (Five Last Days) is a German film about the last days in 1943 of Sophie Scholl. Scholl was a member of the anti-war group Weiße Rose. She was executed for her non-violent activities by the National Socialist regime during the Second World War. The film was directed by Percy Adlon, who also wrote the script. Eleonore Adlon was the producer, and Horst Lermer the cinematographer. The music was taken from Franz Schubert. It was released on 16 October 1982, and was first shown on public television on 20 February 1983. The film received national and international awards for actors and direction.

Plot 
While the later film Sophie Scholl – Die letzten Tage (2005) deals with the last days of Sophie Scholl from her own perspective, Percy Adlon looked at her last five days from the perspective of Else Gebel, a Christian socialist imprisoned with her. The film is focused on the women's situation, exhaustion and relationship, and not on the Gestapo interrogations and the court process.

Roles 
 Lena Stolze: Sophie Scholl
 Irm Hermann: Else Gebel
 Michael Cornelius: Hans Scholl
 Willi Spindler: Civil servant G.
 : Mahr
 : Philip
 : Watchman 1
 
 : Watchman 2
 : Public defender

Reception 
The  noted: "Strict, reserved and detached, a character study in the style of a psychological chamber play that does without narrative embellishment and spectacular dramatisation." ("Streng, zurückhaltend und distanziert inszenierte Charakterstudie im Stil eines psychologischen Kammerspiels, die auf narrative Ausschmückung und spektakuläre Dramatisierung verzichtet.") The journal  described the film as a "brittle chamber play in pale colours" ("... sprödes Kammerspiel in bleichen Farben").

Awards 
 Deutscher Filmpreis 1983:
 Filmband in Gold in the category "Best acting" for Irm Hermann
 Filmband in Gold in the category "Best acting" for Lena Stolze
 Filmband in Silver in the category "Full-length drama film"
 Venice Film Festival 1982: OCIC-Preis
 Jugendfilmfestival Cannes 1983: Prix des Jeunes
 Bayerischer Filmpreis: Regiepreis

See also 
 Die Weiße Rose (film), released 24 September 1982, where Lena Stolze also portrayed Sophie Scholl

References

Further reading

External links 
 
 Fünf letzte Tage kinowelt-international.de

1982 drama films
1982 films
German biographical drama films
White Rose
1980s German films
West German films